Altamont was an unincorporated community in Greenville County, South Carolina. Its summer post office operated from 1896 to 1915.

Sources
 Journal of the American Philatelist, published monthly. State College, Pennsylvania. Use form US-T154/MMYYYY/p#. 072000/p648
 Altamont, South Carolina. Geographic Names Information System, U.S. Geological Survey.

Former populated places in South Carolina
Populated places in Greenville County, South Carolina
Unincorporated communities in Greenville County, South Carolina